Mandraikos Football Club is a Greek football club, based in Mandra, Attica.

The club was founded in 1956. They played in Football League 2 for the season 2013-14.

History
The Mandraikos F.C. officially founded in 1956 and originally belonged to Piraeus Football Clubs Association. Already existed from 1931 as Mandraikos and for two seasons (1953-1955) as Panmandraikos.
First time played in Delta Ethniki in 1985-86 season. 
In 2005 change football association and is now part of West Attica Football Clubs Association.

External links
 http://mandraikosfc.blogspot.gr

Football clubs in Attica